In economics, average variable cost (AVC) is a firm's variable costs (labour, electricity, etc.) divided by the quantity of output produced. Variable costs are those costs which vary with the output level:

where  = variable cost,  = average variable cost, and  = quantity of output produced.

Average variable cost plus average fixed cost equals average total cost:

A firm would choose to shut down if the price of its output  is below average variable cost at the profit-maximizing level of output (or, more generally if it sells at multiple prices, its average revenue is less than AVC). Producing anything would not generate revenue significant enough to offset the associated variable costs; producing some output would add losses (additional costs in excess of revenues) to the costs inevitably being incurred (the fixed costs). By not producing, the firm loses only the fixed costs.

As a result, the firm's short-run supply curve has output of 0 when the price is below the minimum AVC and jumps to output such that  for higher prices, where  denotes marginal cost.

See also
Variable cost
Fixed cost
Cost curve

References

Costs